The 1990–91 NBA season was the Bullets' 30th season in the National Basketball Association. In the off-season, the Bullets acquired second-year forward Pervis Ellison from the Sacramento Kings. The team struggled with a 4–10 start in November, but played around .500 afterwards and held a 21–27 record at the All-Star break. However, with a nine-game losing streak between February and March, the Bullets' struggles continued as they finished fourth in the Atlantic Division with a 30–52 record.

Bernard King averaged 28.4 points, 5.0 rebounds and 4.6 assists per game, and was named to the All-NBA Third Team, and selected for the 1991 NBA All-Star Game. In addition, Harvey Grant showed improvement averaging 18.2 points and 7.2 rebounds per game, while Ledell Eackles contributed 13.0 points per game, Hot Plate Williams provided with 12.5 points and 5.4 rebounds per game, but only played just 33 games due to a knee injury and weight problems, where he weighed up to 302 lbs. and Ellison averaged 10.4 points, 7.7 rebounds and 2.1 blocks per game. Darrell Walker averaged 7.8 points, 7.0 rebounds and 6.5 assists per game, while rookie guard A.J. English contributed 8.8 points per game off the bench, and Charles Jones provided with 5.8 rebounds and 2.0 blocks per game. Grant also finished in fourth place in Most Improved Player voting. Following the season, Walker was traded to the Detroit Pistons.

On April 4, 1991, during a home game against the Portland Trail Blazers, Walker, Ellison, head coach Wes Unseld, and the Bullets' mascot "Hoops", were all ejected out of the game by referee Steve Javie, as the Bullets lost to the Blazers, 105-96.

NBA Draft

Roster

Regular season

Season standings

z - clinched division title
y - clinched division title
x - clinched playoff spot

Record vs. opponents

Game log

Player statistics

Awards and Records
 Bernard King, All-NBA Third Team

Transactions

See also
 1990–91 NBA season

References

External links
 1990-91 Washington Bullets Statistics

Washington Wizards seasons
Wash
Wiz
Wiz